There are at least 52 named lakes and reservoirs in Carter County, Montana.

Lakes
 Soda Lakes, el.

Reservoirs
 Abel Reservoir, el. 
 Apache Reservoir, el. 
 Bar C Reservoir, el. 
 Blackfoot Reservoir, el. 
 Brewer Reservoir, el. 
 Bucholtz Reservoir, el. 
 Burditt Reservoir, el. 
 Cherokee Reservoir, el. 
 Cheyenne Reservoir, el. 
 Cochran Reservoir, el. 
 Dead Horse Reservoir, el. 
 Devils Canyon Reservoir, el. 
 Dewdrop Reservoir, el. 
 Dugout Reservoir, el. 
 E-B Reservoir, el. 
 Etta Reservoir, el. 
 Evans Reservoir, el. 
 Flat Reservoir, el. 
 Gergen Reservoir, el. 
 Gravel Pit Reservoir, el. 
 Gros Ventre Reservoir, el. 
 Herman Reservoir, el. 
 Horse Killer Reservoir, el. 
 J Oliver Reservoir, el. 
 Jay Reservoir, el. 
 L O Reservoir, el. 
 L/W Reservoir, el. 
 Lampkin Gulch Reservoir, el. 
 Lindsey Reservoir, el. 
 Little Britches Reservoir, el. 
 Lone Tree Reservoir Number One, el. 
 Lone Tree Reservoir Number Two, el. 
 Long Reservoir, el. 
 Maverick Reservoir, el. 
 Mobray Reservoir Number 2, el. 
 Mobray Reservoir Number 3, el. 
 Navaho Reservoir, el. 
 Pendleton Reservoir, el. 
 Pentecost Reservoir, el. 
 Phillippi Reservoir, el. 
 Pot Hole Reservoir, el. 
 Schmidt Reservoir, el. 
 Section 21 Reservoir, el. 
 Sioux Reservoir, el. 
 Summers Reservoir, el. 
 Trenk Reservoir, el. 
 Ute Reservoir, el. 
 V-Bar-S Reservoir, el. 
 West Lindsey Reservoir, el. 
 West Plum Creek Reservoir, el. 
 Wichiup Reservoir, el.

See also
 List of lakes in Montana

Notes

Bodies of water of Carter County, Montana
Carter